Middle East Radio is an Egyptian pan-Arab commercial radio station established in 1964 by the Egyptian Radio and Television Union (ERTU) owned by the Egyptian government.

It started broadcasting on 30 May 1964 distinguishing itself from its main pan-Arab rival Voice of the Arabs (إذاعة صوت العرب transliterated as Sawt al-Arab) with more popular programming as opposed to its rival's more dogmatic and propagandist content. The station ran at times ads targeting the Middle East and North Africa through its powerful medium wave broadcasting facilities.

The broadcasts were extended to reach 24 hours per day in 1996 (Ramadan 1416 Hijri).

The station has progressed into a major local Egyptian network broadcasting within Egypt on 89.5 FM in Greater Cairo with rebroadcasts on 96.3 FM in El Mahalla El Kubra and on NileSat 11766H

See also
 List of radio stations in Egypt

Radio stations in Egypt